Karim Mostafa Benzema (born 19 December 1987) is a French professional footballer who plays as a striker for and captains La Liga club Real Madrid. A creative and prolific forward, Benzema is regarded as one of the best strikers of all time. He is Real Madrid's all-time second-highest goalscorer and top assist provider. Benzema has won 24 trophies with Real Madrid, including four La Liga, two Copa del Rey and five UEFA Champions League titles.

Born in Lyon to Algerian parents, Benzema began his career with hometown club Olympique Lyonnais in 2005, contributing sporadically to three Ligue 1 title wins. In 2008, he was named the league's Player of the Year and in the Team of the Year having finished as the league's top goalscorer and winning his fourth league title and first Coupe de France. In 2009, Benzema was the subject of a then-French record football transfer when he joined Real Madrid in a deal worth €35 million. After struggling to establish himself in his debut season, he eventually achieved a consistent goalscoring rate with the club, notably being part of a highly rated trio alongside Cristiano Ronaldo and Gareth Bale — dubbed BBC — who were integral to four Champions League wins from 2014 to 2018.

Following Ronaldo's departure in 2018, Benzema transitioned from the false 9 position into a sole striker. He was named in the La Liga Team of the Season for four consecutive years from 2018 to 2022, won La Liga Best Player twice and the Pichichi Trophy for the first time in 2022. Benzema finished as Champions League top scorer as he won his fifth title in 2022. 

A French international, Benzema won the 2004 UEFA European Under-17 Championship and made his senior debut for France in 2007, at age 19. He earned 97 caps, including scoring in three and appearing in four major tournaments, and ranks as France's fifth-highest all-time top goalscorer. Benzema was controversially left out of the squad for the 2010 World Cup and did not play for France for over five years after being implicated in a blackmailing scandal in 2015; he later returned to the squad before announcing his international retirement in December 2022. He has been named French Player of the Year by France Football four times. For his performances in 2021 and 2022, Benzema was awarded the UEFA Player of the Year and the Ballon d'Or, becoming the fifth French player to have won the Ballon d'Or. At 34 years and 302 days old, he is the second-oldest winner of the award, after Stanley Matthews.

Club career

Early career

Benzema began his football career at his hometown club Bron Terraillon SC at the age of eight. While at the club, he was nicknamed Coco by friends and, after scoring two goals in an under-10 match against the Lyon youth academy, began attracting attention from the biggest club in the city. According to Serge Santa Cruz, who was president of Bron Terraillon in the 1990s, Lyon officials had visited him directly in an attempt to sign the youngster; however, Santa Cruz refused. After talking with Benzema's father, the club allowed the player to undergo a trial with Lyon. Following the trial, Benzema officially joined Lyon and was inserted into the club's academy.

Lyon
Benzema quickly ascended up the youth categories in the academy. He served as a ballboy during Lyon senior team matches and performed well in school being described as a student who was "discreet and respectful". At under-16 level, Benzema scored 38 goals in the Championnat National des 16 ans, the domestic league for under-16 youth players in France. Ahead of the 2004–05 season, Benzema was promoted to the club's reserve team, which was playing in the Championnat de France amateur, the fourth division of French football. Despite only playing with the team during the autumn campaign, he scored a team-high ten goals as the Lyon reserve team finished second in its group.

2004–2007: Breakthrough and three league titles
Benzema was called up to the senior team for the first time under manager Paul Le Guen during the break leading up to the second half of the season. As is customary with new players arriving at Lyon, the young striker had to stand up and speak to his new teammates, which at that time included the likes of Michael Essien, Sylvain Wiltord, Florent Malouda and Eric Abidal. While speaking, Benzema was subjected to jokes and laughter, which prompted the youngster to declare, "Do not laugh, I'm here to take your place." He made his professional debut on 15 January 2005 against Metz, appearing as a substitute for Pierre-Alain Frau. Lyon won the match 2–0 as Benzema provided the assist of the second goal scored by Bryan Bergougnoux. He signed his first professional contract the same month, agreeing to a three-year deal. After making three more appearances as a substitute, on 2 April Benzema made his first professional start in a 1–0 win over Lens. He finished the campaign with six appearances as Lyon won their fourth-straight league title.

Benzema began the 2005–06 season under the tutelage of new manager Gérard Houllier. Under Houllier, he struggled for meaningful minutes due to the presence of newly signed Brazilian striker Fred, as well as Sylvain Wiltord. Benzema made his season debut on 2 October 2005 in a league win over Rennes, appearing as a substitute. On 6 December, he made his UEFA Champions League debut in Lyon's final group stage match against Norwegian club Rosenborg. On his competition debut, he scored his first professional goal in a 2–1 win. A month later, Benzema scored his first professional double in a 4–0 win over Grenoble in the Coupe de France. On 4 March 2006, Benzema scored his first professional league goal against Ajaccio in a 3–1 win.

Benzema began earning more playing time in the 2006–07 season and made his competitive season debut in the 2006 Trophée des Champions against Paris Saint-Germain. In the French Supercup, Benzema converted a penalty which drew the match at 1–1. Lyon later won the league curtain-raiser 5–4 on penalties. Benzema opened the league campaign on a quick note scoring in the team's first match of the season against Nantes. Three weeks later, on 26 August 2006, Benzema appeared as a substitute and scored two goals in a 4–1 away win over Nice. He also converted two goals in the Champions League group stage against Romanian outfit Steaua București and Ukrainian club Dynamo Kyiv. After appearing regularly during the autumn campaign, on 10 November, Benzema suffered a severe thigh injury. The injury resulted in the striker missing three months of action before returning in February 2007. Benzema failed to score a goal until the final league match of the season against Nantes as Lyon recorded its sixth consecutive league title.

2007–2009: Club talisman
For the 2007–08 season, with Florent Malouda, John Carew and Sylvain Wiltord all departing from the club, Benzema switched to the number 10 shirt and was inserted into the lead striker role. After forming a special relationship with new manager Alain Perrin, he responded with 31 goals in 51 games. He topped the league with 20 goals, scored four goals in the Champions League, one in the Coupe de la Ligue and totaled six goals in six Coupe de France matches, helping Lyon win their first ever double. Some of his more dazzling performances that season included a hat-trick against Metz on 15 September, an equalizing goal in the 90th minute from a free kick against Derby du Rhône rivals Saint-Étienne, and a goal against Lens that was nominated for goal of the season by fans.

In the Champions League, Benzema scored an important double against Rangers at Ibrox Stadium on the last match day of the group stage. The 3–0 victory assured Lyon progression to the knockout rounds. In the knockout rounds, Lyon faced Manchester United and Benzema continued to score, this time it was from outside the penalty box in the first leg match which ended in a 1–1 draw and United eventually won the tie 1–2 on aggregate. Manchester United manager Sir Alex Ferguson and players praised Benzema for his performance. Lyon club president Jean-Michel Aulas later accused Ferguson of tapping-up Benzema.

On 13 March 2008, Benzema extended his contract with Lyon until 2013 with a one-year extension option. After signing his new contract, Benzema became one of the highest paid footballers in France. For his efforts that season, he was named the Ligue 1 Player of the Year, selected to the Team of the Year and awarded the Trophée du Meilleur Buteur for being the league's top scorer. He won the 2008 Bravo Award given to the most outstanding young footballer playing in Europe, and was also shortlisted by French magazine France Football for the 2008 Ballon d'Or award, eventually won by Cristiano Ronaldo.

Benzema got off to a good start for the 2008–09 season, scoring twice in Lyon's opening league match against Toulouse. The following three weeks, he scored goals against Rhône-Alpes rivals Grenoble and Saint-Étienne and scored a goal against Nice, converting a penalty in the dying seconds. Lyon won all three matches. As a result of his early goals, Lyon club president Jean-Michel Aulas quelled the many transfer rumors surrounding Benzema by placing a €100 million price tag on the striker. He was also nominated alongside Franck Ribéry to be featured on the French cover of the video game FIFA 09.

He scored his seventh goal of the league on 29 October, scoring in the 2–0 win over Sochaux. Benzema scored again the following weekend in a 2–0 win over Le Mans. He was among the top scorers in the Champions League group stage, scoring five goals, a double against Steaua București, two goals in two matches against Fiorentina, and a goal against the eventual group winners Bayern Munich on the final match day.

Following the winter break, Benzema endured a rough patch going scoreless the first three games before recording his 11th goal of the season against Nice in a 3–1 victory. Two weeks later, he scored his 12th goal against Nancy in a 2–0 victory. The next nine matches, both Benzema and Lyon's form dwindled losing four matches, drawing three and winning only two with Benzema scoring only two goals in that stretch, both of them against Le Mans in a 3–1 victory. The bad form resulted in Lyon losing their grip on first-place position and eventually falling out of the title race, thus ending their streak of seven consecutive Ligue 1 titles. Benzema was a part of four of those title runs.

Despite losing the title, Benzema got back on track scoring his 15th and 16th goals of the season on 17 May in a 3–1 away victory over rivals Marseille, the first goal being a penalty. He scored his 17th goal the following weekend against Caen in a 3–1 victory moving him into third place among Ligue 1 top scorers.

Real Madrid

2009–10: Transfer and adapting to Spain
On 1 July 2009, it was announced that Lyon had reached an agreement with Spanish club Real Madrid for the transfer of Benzema. The transfer fee was priced at €35 million with the fee rising to as much as €41 million based on incentives. On 9 July, Benzema successfully passed his medical and signed his contract, a six-year deal, later that afternoon. He was presented officially as a Real Madrid player later that night at the Santiago Bernabéu Stadium, similarly to the previous signings of Kaká and Cristiano Ronaldo. Benzema made his Real Madrid debut on 20 July in the club's opening pre-season friendly against Irish club Shamrock Rovers in Dublin, appearing as a half-time substitute. He scored the lone goal in the club's 1–0 win, scoring in the 87th minute. On 24 August, Benzema netted two goals in Real Madrid's 4–0 victory over Norwegian club Rosenborg in an annual friendly tournament organized for the Santiago Bernabeu Trophy. The goals brought his total tally in the pre-season with Real Madrid to five, making him the joint top scorer alongside fellow striker Raúl.

Benzema made his league debut for Madrid on 29 August 2009 against Deportivo La Coruña. He started the match, but was substituted out in the second half as Madrid won 3–2. A month later, he scored his first goal for the club in a 5–0 victory against newly promoted Xerez. After missing the mid-week match against Villarreal, against Tenerife at the weekend, Benzema scored his first double for Madrid in a 3–0 home victory. He made his Champions League debut for the club on 30 September in a group stage tie against Marseille. After failing to score a goal in the month of October, in the team's first match in November against Italian club Milan in the Champions League, Benzema scored the opener to give Madrid a 1–0 lead. His goal was later cancelled out by a Ronaldinho penalty.

In late November, Benzema began appearing mainly as a substitute as manager Manuel Pellegrini preferred Gonzalo Higuaín in the lead striker role. To coincide with his benching, the striker was also being criticized by the Spanish media for his under-performance and difficulties settling in the country as he had not yet begun learning the Spanish language. He was even declared the "new Anelka" by a Spanish newspaper Marca blogger, referring to former Real Madrid striker Nicolas Anelka who had a tumultuous year at the club before being sold. Benzema was defended by his compatriot Zinedine Zidane, who admitted "after two months, I was also criticized" and that Benzema was "a talented player and talented players in Madrid must win".

On 5 December, Benzema appeared as a substitute for Rafael van der Vaart and scored the third goal in a 6–0 romp of Almería. The day after the match against Almería, Benzema responded to the criticism by stating, "I am totally integrated and very happy at Real Madrid", and, "Yes, I have improved my adaptation. I have a new home and I'm learning Spanish to understand myself better with my teammates." After nearly a month coming off of the bench, he started alongside Higuaín away to Valencia on 12 December. A week later, Benzema returned to the bench. Following an injury to Higuaín in early January 2010, Pellegrini inserted Benzema back into the starting lineup. After failing to score in his first two starts in the absence of Higuaín, against Deportivo La Coruña on 30 January, he scored a double in an important 3–1 away win. Following the return of Higuaín, Benzema was relegated back to a substitute's role and finished the campaign by making eight consecutive appearances off the bench. Included in one of those appearances was his final goal of the season against Athletic Bilbao in a 5–1 win.

2010–11: First-team mainstay

Ahead of the 2010–11 season, Benzema switched to the number 9 shirt as Real Madrid were under the tutelage of new incoming manager José Mourinho. The striker immediately drew the ire of Mourinho who declared to reporters during a pre-season media session that "Benzema must understand that he is extremely talented, but that in itself is not enough", while also stating that "[Madrid] need a striker who is sparky, not one that is listless". Mourinho sentiments were later echoed by incoming France national team coach Laurent Blanc who acknowledged that Benzema was "not used to working". Blanc also stated that the striker needed to shed weight in order to fulfill his potential.

Due to Mourinho preferring Ronaldo and Higuaín as his forwards, Benzema began the campaign as a substitute coming off the bench in the team's opening league match of the season against Mallorca. Following the September international break, he made his first start in a 1–0 win over Osasuna. On 21 September, Benzema made a substitute appearance and scored his first goal of the season in a 3–0 home win against Espanyol. Afterwards, the striker failed to score a domestic goal for nearly two months.

On 10 November, Benzema scored his second goal of the campaign against Real Murcia in the 2010–11 edition of the Copa del Rey. In late November, Benzema was inserted into the starting eleven following a severe back injury to Higuaín, along with the team's lack of senior strikers. In his first match since being inserted into the starting lineup permanently, he scored his first Champions League goal of the season in a group stage fixture against Dutch club Ajax. In Madrid's final group stage tie against French outfit Auxerre, Benzema scored his first hat trick for the club in a 4–0 win. The first goal he scored was Real Madrid's 300th goal in the Champions League era. Two weeks later, Benzema converted another hat trick, this time in an 8–0 thrashing of Levante in the Copa del Rey. In late January, for the first time in his Real Madrid career, Benzema scored goals in back-to-back matches. On 23 January, he scored the only goal in a 1–0 win at home against Mallorca. Three days later, Benzema repeated his efforts scoring the only goal in a win over Sevilla in the first leg of the team's Copa del Rey semi-final tie. Real Madrid later advanced to its 37th Copa del Rey final in club history after beating Sevilla 2–0 in the second leg.

Following the arrival of Emmanuel Adebayor on loan, Benzema went unused in two consecutive league matches in February 2011. He returned to the starting lineup on 19 February and embarked on a run in which he scored ten goals in eight matches. Included in those ten goals were doubles in three straight matches against Málaga, Racing de Santander and Hércules, as well as a goal in the first leg of Madrid's Round of 16 tie against former club Lyon. The strike against his hometown club was the 100th goal of his professional career, and also the first goal for Real Madrid at the Stade de Gerland in six years, though despite the honours associated with netting the goal, Benzema did not celebrate out of respect for his former club.

On 19 March, he scored the opener in the El Derbi madrileño as Real Madrid went on to win the match 2–1. Despite his form, Benzema appeared in only one of the four highly anticipated matches against El Clásico rivals Barcelona, in which the two clubs met in the league, the 2011 Copa del Rey Final and the Champions League knockout stage. In between those clashes, on 23 April 2011, Benzema scored a goal in a 6–3 win over Valencia. On 30 April, he scored a goal in the team's 3–2 loss to Real Zaragoza. It was the only match of the campaign that Real Madrid lost, in which Benzema scored. To close out the campaign, Benzema scored another double in an 8–1 win over Almería. He finished the campaign second on the team behind Ronaldo with 26 goals as Real Madrid captured the Copa del Rey giving Benzema his first honour with the club. For his performances during the campaign, particularly during the second half, Benzema was praised by Mourinho, club officials Florentino Pérez and Emilio Butragueño, as well as national team manager Laurent Blanc.

2011–12: First La Liga championship
Prior to the start of the 2011–12 season, Benzema, taking the advice of compatriots Blanc and Zidane, ventured to Merano, Italy, to attend a high performance clinic where he underwent treatment to reduce his weight. The spell at the clinic was ultimately a success after the striker arrived at pre-season  lighter. While at the clinic, Benzema also underwent physical training to build up his muscle mass. The striker was impressive in the pre-season scoring eight goals in seven matches. His performances during the pre-season resulted in Mourinho naming him the starting lead striker for the new campaign. Mourinho was later credited with Benzema's transformation, but denied full responsibility and, instead, gave credit to the striker himself.

In the second leg of the 2011 Supercopa de España against Barcelona, and with Madrid trailing 4–3 on aggregate late in the match, Benzema scored the equalizing goal to even the tie at 4–4. However, six minutes later, a Lionel Messi strike gave Barcelona the supercup. In the team's second league match of the season against Getafe, Benzema scored a double in a 4–2 victory. After going goalless in three consecutive league matches, he scored his third league goal of the campaign against Rayo Vallecano in a 4–2 win. In the team's ensuing match against Ajax in the Champions League, Benzema scored Madrid's third goal in a 3–0 home win. In the club's next Champions League match against Lyon, Benzema scored again by netting the opener in a 4–0 win against Lyon.

In November 2011, Benzema scored five goals; three in the league and two in Europe. In the league, he converted his three goals in wins over Osasuna and Valencia, while he scored his two Champions League goals in a 6–2 group stage win over Croatian club Dinamo Zagreb. On 10 December 2011, Benzema scored the opener in Madrid's 3–1 defeat to Barcelona in the El Clásico. The goal, scored just 21 seconds into the match, was the fastest goal ever scored in a match between the two rivals. Three days after his record-breaking goal, for his performances during the 2011 calendar year, Benzema was named the France Football French Player of the Year, beating out Barcelona defender Eric Abidal and Lyon goalkeeper Hugo Lloris. He became only the second French player based in Spain to win the award, and also the second Real Madrid player to capture it. Zidane was the first to achieve both honorable mentions. Benzema expressed gratitude at winning the award, stating, "It is a pleasure to win an individual trophy. When I see the previous winners – Zidane, Henry and other major players – it makes me proud to join them on the list." In the team's next match after winning the award, against Sevilla, Benzema assisted two goals in a 6–2 triumph.

Benzema opened the 2012 portion of the campaign in positive form. He scored goals against Granada and Málaga. Benzema scored against the latter club in the Copa del Rey in each leg of the Round of 16. The 4–2 aggregate win advanced Real Madrid to the quarter-finals where the club faced Barcelona. After failing to score in the first leg, which ended 2–1 in favour of Barça, in the second leg on 25 January 2012, Benzema scored his third goal of the season against the Blaugrana, but Madrid failed to win the tie losing 4–3 on aggregate. On 12 February, Benzema scored his first league goal in over a month against Levante. A week later, he scored a double in a 4–0 shutout of Racing Santander. On 24 March, Benzema scored two goals in a league win over Real Sociedad. The two goals made him the top French scorer in La Liga history surpassing Zidane. Three days later, Benzema scored another double in a 3–0 first leg away win over Cypriot club APOEL in the Champions League quarter-finals. On 29 April, Benzema put in a masterful performance scoring two goals and assisting another in a 3–0 win over Sevilla. The double was his seventh of the season and allowed Madrid to close in on its first Primera Division title in four years. Los Blancos captured their 32nd league title the following week cruising to a 3–0 win over Athletic Bilbao. Benzema appeared as a second-half substitute in the match.

2012–2016: Sustained continental success
On the first matchday of the Champions League, Benzema scored an equalizer against Manchester City in 3–2 win at Santiago Bernabéu. On 4 October 2012, Benzema scored a bicycle kick goal off a cross by Kaká in a 4–1 win against Ajax in Amsterdam. On 18 December, one day before his 25th birthday, his fine form saw him earn the award for best French footballer of 2012, for the second year running. On 2 March 2013, Benzema opened the scoring against Barcelona in the league game at the Santiago Bernabéu. Real went on to win the game 2–1, the second time they beat Barcelona in a week.

Ahead of the 2013–14 season, Benzema became part of a trio alongside Cristiano Ronaldo and newly signed Gareth Bale — dubbed BBC. Benzema started the season by scoring in a 2–1 win over Real Betis at the Santiago Bernabéu. After four matches without scoring (two with Real Madrid and two with France), he returned to goal-scoring form by netting twice in a 6–1 away win over Galatasaray in Champions League. On 18 January 2014, he scored his 100th goal for Madrid in a 5–0 victory at Real Betis. On 23 March, Benzema scored two goals against fierce rivals Barcelona in El Clásico at the Bernabéu from two crosses by Ángel Di María, taking his goal tally in La Liga to 17 goals, though Barcelona won the match 4–3.

Benzema was part of Real Madrid's starting eleven in the 2014 Copa del Rey Final on 16 April at the Mestalla Stadium, and assisted Di María's opening goal before Gareth Bale hit the winner for Madrid in a 2–1 victory. One week later, on 23 April, Benzema scored the only goal of the game to win the first leg of a Champions League semi-final against Bayern Munich, 1–0. The club went on to win the final in May. Real Madrid's attacking trio of Bale, Benzema and Cristiano, dubbed "BBC", finished the season with 97 goals.

On 6 August 2014, Real Madrid announced that Benzema had signed a new five-year deal that will keep him at the club until 2019. On 12 August 2014, Benzema played the whole 90 minutes in Real Madrid's 2–0 win against Sevilla in Cardiff to claim the UEFA Super Cup. On 16 September, Benzema scored Real Madrid's 1,000th goal in European competition after netting a goal in a 5–1 victory over FC Basel in the first match of the Champions League group stage. He scored the winning goal in Real Madrid's 2–1 away victory against Ludogorets Razgrad in the Champions League after coming on as a second-half substitute. The next weekend, he scored a brace in the 5–0 victory against Athletic Bilbao in La Liga. In 2014, Benzema won France Football's award for French Player of the Year for the third time; only Thierry Henry has won this award on more occasions.

Benzema was chosen as La Liga Player of the Month for October 2014, with his manager Carlo Ancelotti winning the equivalent award. He scored three of Real Madrid's 13 goals of the month, in which they won three matches and only conceded just one goal. On 8 December 2015, Benzema scored a hat trick in an 8–0 thrashing against Malmö FF. On 20 December, he scored another hat trick in a 10–2 victory over Rayo Vallecano. He was a regular starter when the team won the 2015–16 UEFA Champions League.

2016–2018: European threepeat and second league title

In December 2016, Benzema was called up in Real Madrid's squad for 2016 FIFA Club World Cup in Japan. In the semi-final match against América on 15 December, Benzema scored in the last moments of the first half, helping the team to progress in the final by winning 2–0. In the final three days later against Kashima Antlers, Benzema opened the score in the 9th minute, and also assisted Ronaldo's second goal, as Real Madrid won 4–2 in extra time after the regular time finished 2–2 to claim their second title. It was Benzema's tenth title with Real Madrid, and finished the competition as joint-second topscorer with two goals in two matches.

On 15 February 2017, in the first leg of 2016–17 UEFA Champions League round of 16 against Napoli, Benzema scored Real Madrid's first goal in an eventual 3–1 home win, which was his 51st goal in this competition, overtaking Thierry Henry on the list of all-time Champions League top scorers. It was his first goal in six matches and for this performance he was voted Man of the Match. He was a regular starter, and scored the last goal of the season which gave him eleven for the campaign, when Madrid won the 2016–17 La Liga and the 2016–17 UEFA Champions League.

On 20 September 2017, Benzema signed a contract extension that will keep him at the club until 2021. Later on 6 March of the following year, Benzema made his 100th UEFA Champions League appearance by playing in the 2–1 win at Parc des Princes against Paris Saint-Germain in the second leg of 2017–18 UEFA Champions League round of 16 as Real Madrid progressed to the next round 5–2 on aggregate. Benzema played his 400th match in all competitions for Real Madrid on 31 March in the 3–0 win at Las Palmas, captaining the team and netting the second goal with a penalty. On 1 May, Benzema scored twice in a 2–2 draw against Bayern Munich in the return leg of the 2017–18 UEFA Champions League semi-final, as Real progressed to the final on a 4–3 aggregate. On 26 May, Benzema scored the first goal of the match in 2018 UEFA Champions League Final by intercepting Loris Karius's throw in a 3–1 victory over Liverpool, when Madrid won their third consecutive and 13th overall Champions League title.

2018–2021: Club talisman, third league title and the return of Zidane
With the departure of Cristiano Ronaldo to Juventus in July 2018, Benzema became Real Madrid's new goal-getter – scoring 30 goals in all competitions in 2018–19 as the club's top scorer for the campaign. His prominence in Real Madrid's squad significantly increased.

On 7 November 2018, Benzema scored a brace in the 5–0 win at Viktoria Plzeň in the UEFA Champions League group stage, reaching the 200th goal milestone with the club, becoming only the seventh Madrid player to achieve the feat. He scored three goals in six matches, all of them against Plzeň, helping Real Madrid topping Group G. Later on 13 February of the following year, in the first leg of the competition's round of 16, Benzema scored the opener of a 2–1 away win over Ajax, reaching 60 Champions League goals, becoming only the fourth player to do so.

Benzema scored Madrid's first competitive goal of the 2019–20 season on 17 August in the 3–1 away win over Celta Vigo in the opening La Liga match. Later, on 6 November, he scored a brace in Madrid's 6–0 crushing of Galatasaray, achieving two new milestones: he become the second player after Lionel Messi to score in 15 consecutive Champions League seasons and also the third Madrid player to score 50 goals in the competition. His performances were praised by manager Zinedine Zidane, who called him a legend and also compared him with Cristiano Ronaldo. Three days later, in the next league match, he scored a first-half brace in a 4–0 win at Eibar, overtaking Ferenc Puskás as the club's sixth all-time goalscorer in La Liga with 157 goals from 323 appearances. In February 2020, Benzema extended his contract with Real Madrid until 2022. On 1 March, he made his 500th appearance for Real Madrid in a 2–0 home win over Barcelona in El Clásico, becoming the fourteenth player in the club's history to achieve this milestone. At the end of the season, Real Madrid won the 2019–20 La Liga, while scoring over 20 goals.

When La Liga restarted after a three-month hiatus due to the COVID-19 pandemic, Benzema scored a brace against Valencia in Real Madrid's second game back at the Alfredo Di Stéfano Stadium on 18 June – his first goals at Madrid's new temporary home ground. Benzema's brace saw him surpass Ferenc Puskás as Real Madrid's fourth All-Time Top Scorer with 304 goals.

On 16 July, Benzema's brace against Villarreal secured Real Madrid's 34th La Liga title, after a 2–1 win at the Di Stefano – their 10th consecutive league win after the lockdown. On 7 August, Benzema scored Madrid's only goal at the Etihad as they went crashing out of the Champions League to Manchester City (2–4 on aggregate) to end the campaign. For the second consecutive season, Benzema finished as the club's top scorer with 27 goals in all competitions.

Benzema opened his goal account for 2020–21 on 4 October, away to Levante in La Liga, netting his 250th goal for Real Madrid in all competitions. On 27 October, he scored an acrobatic over-the-head goal in a 2–2 draw against Borussia Mönchengladbach at Borussia-Park in the Champions League, to become the second player in history after Lionel Messi to score in 16 consecutive Champions League seasons. On 9 December, he scored a brace in a 2–0 win over Borussia Mönchengladbach to send Real Madrid to the Champions League knockout stages as group winners. On 21 April, Benzema scored a brace and assisted another in a 3–0 away win at Cádiz, which meant he scored against all 35 teams he has played against in La Liga.

2021–22: Vice-captaincy, fourth league title, UCL top scorer and Ballon d'Or
With the departure of Sergio Ramos to PSG, Benzema was promoted as Real Madrid's vice-captain for the 2021–22 season under Ancelotti. On 14 August, Benzema scored a brace against Alaves as Los Blancos kicked off the league season with a 1–4 away win to sit at the top of the table. Benzema's first half volley was the first official goal under Ancelotti in his second stint. Six days later, Benzema signed a contract extension with Real Madrid, keeping him at the club until 2023.

Benzema scored his first hat-trick in three seasons in a 5–2 win over Celta Vigo on 12 September as Madrid returned to the Bernabeu for the first time since March 2020. Wearing the armband, Benzema was the first Madrid captain to score a hat-trick since Raul in 2008. One week later, Benzema and Vini Jr would combine twice in the last few minutes against Valencia at the Mestalla to complete a comeback to earn Madrid their first win at the Mestalla in four seasons. On 22 September, Benzema scored a brace and provided another two assists in a 6–1 win over Mallorca at the Bernabeu. Benzema's brace allowed him to become only the fourth Madrid player in history to score 200 La Liga goals after Di Stefano, Raul and Cristiano Ronaldo. On 28 September, Benzema became the first the player in history to score in 17 consecutive Champions League seasons after scoring his first penalty in the competition in a 1–2 home loss against Sheriff in the group stage.

On 22 October, Benzema scored Madrid's 1000th Champions League goal at the Bernabéu against Shakhtar Donetsk. In the process, Benzema scored his 291st and 292nd goals for the club, making him their fourth highest all-time top scorer, overtaking Santillana. With his goal against Sevilla in La Liga on 28 November, he became the highest French goalscorer in club football matches, overtaking Thierry Henry. On 8 January, Benzema scored his 300th goal for Madrid, converting a penalty in a 4–1 win at home in La Liga against Valencia.

On 9 March, he scored a hat-trick within 17 minutes in a remarkable comeback against Paris Saint-Germain in the Champions League round of 16. At the age of 34, Benzema became the oldest player to score a hat-trick in the Champions League. With the three goals, Benzema brought his tally to 309, overtaking Alfredo Di Stéfano as Real Madrid's third-highest all-time goalscorer. On 14 March, Benzema scored a brace in a La Liga match against Mallorca and broke Henry's record, becoming all-time top French goalscorer with 413 goals. On 6 April, he scored another hat-trick in the Champions League in a 3–1 away win over Chelsea in the first leg of the quarter-finals. Benzema became only the second player (after Cristiano Ronaldo) to score back-to-back hat-tricks in successive Champions League knockout matches. One week later in the second leg at the Santiago Bernabéu, Benzema scored a 96th minute header in extra time which proved pivotal, as Madrid lost to Chelsea 2–3 on the night but qualified for the semi-finals 5–4 on aggregate.

On 30 April 2022, he helped Real clinch their 35th Spanish title with a goal in a 4–0 win against Espanyol at the Bernabéu. On 4 May, he scored a decisive goal from the penalty spot in extra time in the second leg against Manchester City and helped Real Madrid reach their 17th European Cup final. By the end of the 2021–22 La Liga season, Benzema won his first Pichichi Trophy with 27 goals in 32 matches. On 28 May, he won his fifth Champions League title after a 1–0 win over Liverpool in the final, and finished the tournament as top scorer with 15 goals in total. On 31 May, Benzema was named the inaugural Champions League player of the season. On 13 August, he was nominated for the Ballon d'Or, widely considered a favourite to win it. In recognition of his performances that season, Benzema was awarded the Ballon d'Or on 17 October.

2022–23: Captaincy and all-time second top scorer
With the departure of Marcelo, Benzema was promoted to captain as the most senior member of the squad. By scoring in the 2022 UEFA Super Cup against Eintracht Frankfurt on 10 August 2022, Benzema brought his tally to 324 goals, overtaking Raúl as Real Madrid's all-time second-highest goalscorer.

International career

Youth
Benzema is a former France youth international having earned caps at all levels for which he was eligible, excluding the under-16 team. He is a member of the group, commonly known in France as the Génération 1987, a youth class that produced current internationals Hatem Ben Arfa, Jérémy Ménez and Samir Nasri, alongside himself. Benzema was the last of the four to make his youth international debut under coach Philippe Bergeroo and officially joined the team ahead of the 2004 UEFA European Under-17 Championship that was played on home soil. In the competition, he appeared in two matches. On his tournament debut, Benzema scored the opening goal in a 3–1 win over Northern Ireland. His lone other appearance in the competition was in a 1–0 group stage win over Spain as France went on to win the tournament defeated the same team in the final.

Benzema was a regular starter in the team at under-18 level. He made his debut with the team at a local tournament in the Czech Republic. Benzema scored his first goal at under-18 level in the competition against Poland in the team's final group stage match. In the final against the hosts, he scored the opening goal in a 2–0 win as France were declared champions of the competition. On 30 September 2004, Benzema was one of three goalscorers in France's 3–0 away win over Norway. In the team's next match against Russia, he scored a double in a 3–1 victory. Due to France winning the 2004 U17 European title, the under-18 team was allowed participation in the 2005 Meridian Cup. Benzema was called up to the team for the competition and played in all four matches, scoring a tournament-high five goals as France were crowned champions of the tournament. He opened the tournament by scoring two goals in a 7–0 victory over Cameroon. After going scoreless in the team's next match against Sierra Leone, Benzema responded by scoring a goal in a shutout victory over Nigeria and netting another double in a 4–1 win against Egypt. On 19 May 2005, in the team's final match of the season against Slovakia, Benzema scored all four goals in a 4–1 victory. He finished the under-18 campaign with 18 appearances and a team-high 14 goals and was, subsequently, praised by Bergeroo who, following the campaign, declared that Benzema was "quite efficient".

The foursome of Benzema, Ben Arfa, Ménez and Nasri returned to international play together for under-19 duty. The four were joined by Issiar Dia, Blaise Matuidi and Serge Gakpé with the objective of winning the 2006 UEFA European Under-19 Championship. The team opened the campaign with two friendly matches against Norway. Over the course of the two matches, Benzema scored one goal, which came in the first match, a 4–0 win. In the first round of qualification for the UEFA-sanctioned tournament, he scored his only goal in the final group match against Austria. France won the match 2–0, which resulted in the team progressing to the Elite Round. In the ensuing round, France were placed in a relatively easy group alongside Scotland, Bulgaria, and Belarus. In the opening group game against Bulgaria, Benzema scored a double converting a penalty and scoring in play as France won 4–0. Both of his goals were scored within a minute of each other. After surprisingly drawing 0–0 with Belarus, France faced Scotland in the final group stage match. Benzema opened the scoring in the 11th minute, but his goal was cancelled out by Steven Fletcher in the second half. The match ultimately finished 1–1 and, despite finishing the round undefeated, France were eliminated after being beaten on points by the Scots.

Benzema made his under-21 debut for Les Espoirs under coach René Girard in the team's first match following the 2006 UEFA European Under-21 Championship against Belgium. He started the match and was replaced at half-time by Yoann Gourcuff. He featured in qualification matches for the 2007 UEFA European Under-21 Championship and appeared as a starter and substitute in the first leg and second leg, respectively, of the team's surprising defeat to Israel in the qualifying playoffs. Despite still being eligible to represent the under-21 team until 2009, his appearance in the second leg defeat to Israel was Benzema's last with the team and he finished his under-21 career with five appearances and no goals. Prior to representing France at senior international level, Benzema was courted by the Algerian Football Federation (FAF) who sought for the player to represent Algeria at senior international level. In December 2006, the striker was approached by former federation president Hamid Haddadj and then-national team coach Jean-Michel Cavalli, but turned down the invitation citing his desire to continue his international career with France. Benzema later told French radio station Radio Monte Carlo "Algeria is my parents' country and it is in my heart, but football-wise, I will only play for the French national team".

Senior

Euro 2008

Benzema was called up for the first time to the senior national team by Raymond Domenech on 9 November 2006 for the team's friendly match against Greece that would be played on 15 November. Benzema described the call-up as "a reward", while also stating "I am pleased, of course, me and my family. A (the senior national team), is the national team's highest honor". Two days before the match, he was forced to withdraw from the team due to a thigh injury, which he suffered while playing domestically for Lyon. After failing to make the squad for the team's February 2007 match against Argentina, Benzema returned to the team in March for a UEFA Euro 2008 qualifying match against Lithuania and a friendly against Austria. After failing to appear in the qualifier, he made his international debut on 28 March 2007 against Austria. Benzema appeared as a half-time substitute for Djibril Cissé and scored the only goal of the match after a free-kick from Samir Nasri. On 13 October, Benzema scored a double in a 6–0 win against the Faroe Islands. After appearing regularly in the team for the rest of the 2007–08 season, he was named to the 23-man squad to participate in UEFA Euro 2008.

Benzema made his debut in the competition on 9 June 2008 in the team's opening match against Romania. Benzema started the match, but was substituted out for Nasri in the second half after a frustrating performance. The match finished 0–0 and Benzema was, subsequently, criticized by the French media for his performance with newspaper Le Point declaring that Benzema was "unrecognizable" and that he "symbolized the impotence of France in the attack". The newspaper also cited his lack of international experience for his subdued performance. In the team's next group game against the Netherlands, Benzema played no part in the 4–1 defeat. He returned to the team in its final group game against Italy and was given a place in the starting lineup. However, France lost 2–0 and were eliminated from the competition.

In November 2008, Benzema, among several other young players in the team, was accused of being insolent during the team's campaign at the European Championship. The accusation came from international teammate William Gallas who inserted the charge in his autobiography. Though most of Gallas' accusations were directed at Nasri, during the competition, it was reported by newspaper Le Parisien that several of the national team players described Benzema as "arrogant" and that the striker was scolded by midfielder Claude Makélélé following the team's loss to the Netherlands.

2010 World Cup omission
Despite the reports from after Euro 2008, Benzema remained a regular in the team and, ahead of qualification for the 2010 FIFA World Cup, switched to the number ten shirt after previously wearing the number nine. In the team's first match following its elimination from Euro 2008, Benzema scored a goal in a 3–2 friendly win over Sweden in Gothenburg. Two months later, he scored another goal in a 3–1 victory against Tunisia at the Stade de France. On 5 June 2009, Benzema converted the only goal of the match, a penalty shot, in a 1–0 win over Turkey at the Stade de Gerland, his home stadium. He scored his first World Cup qualification goals in victories over the Faroe Islands and Austria in October 2009. His cap against Austria would be his last of the Domenech era as he failed to make France's preliminary 30-man squad for the World Cup. Domenech cited Benzema's struggle for form with his new club Real Madrid, rather than his alleged involvement in a sex scandal as his reason for leaving the striker out. Prior to the list being unveiled, Benzema informed Radio Monte Carlo that if he was not selected he would be "very disappointed, but not killed" and "I will support the France team no matter what".

Euro 2012

Following the World Cup, Benzema returned to the national team under the reign of new coach Laurent Blanc. Blanc, an admirer of Benzema, sought to build the attack around the striker and, after going almost a year without representing France, Benzema made his return to the team in its 2–1 defeat to Norway in Oslo. Alongside Gourcuff, Benzema led the team in scoring in qualifying for UEFA Euro 2012, netting three. He scored his three goals in wins over Bosnia and Herzegovina, Luxembourg, and Albania. On 17 November 2010, Benzema scored the opening goal in France's 2–1 win over England at Wembley Stadium. In the team's next match against Brazil in February 2011, he scored the only goal for France in a 1–0 win. After appearing regularly in qualifying for Euro 2012, on 29 May 2012, Benzema was named to the squad to participate in the competition. On 5 June, in the team's final warm-up friendly ahead of the European Championship, Benzema scored two goals in a 4–0 shutout win over Estonia. At Euro 2012, Benzema started the team's opening match against England, which ended in a 1–1 draw. In the team's ensuing group stage match against the Ukraine, he assisted both the goals in a 2–0 win.

2014 World Cup
On 11 October 2013, Benzema scored his first goal for the France national team since June 2012 in a friendly against Australia, thus ending a scoring drought for his national team which had lasted 1,222 minutes. In that match played at the Parc des Princes in Paris, which France won 6–0, Benzema scored France's sixth and final goal in the 50th minute after turning home Franck Ribéry's left-wing cross. In the second leg of the 2014 World Cup qualification play-off against Ukraine held on 19 November 2013 at the Stade de France, Benzema scored France's second goal in the 34th minute to level the aggregate score at 2–2. Benzema scored his goal when he side-footed home after a huge scramble in the Ukrainian penalty box, although he was shown on television replays to be offside by almost one metre when the ball took a final touch off Mathieu Valbuena's chest. Benzema had four minutes earlier been denied a legitimate goal, the offside flag wrongly raised when he turned in Ribéry's low cross into the net with his torso a metre from the Ukrainian goal-line. Ukraine had won the first leg of the play-off 2–0 in Kyiv just four days earlier. France would eventually win the second leg 3–0 to advance to the 2014 World Cup finals in Brazil with a 3–2 aggregate scoreline.

On 6 June 2014, Benzema was named in France's squad for the 2014 FIFA World Cup, making his debut in the tournament. In the team's first match, a 3–0 win against Honduras in Porto Alegre on 15 June, he scored a goal in each half, the first from a penalty kick. He also took part in the team's second goal, when his shot rebounded off the post and was fumbled over the goal-line by Honduran goalkeeper Noel Valladares for an own goal, the first World Cup goal given by goal-line technology. He was named by FIFA as man of the match for his performance. In the second group fixture, he scored and had a penalty saved in a 5–2 defeat of Switzerland, as Les Bleus all but secured qualification to the knockout stage. France were later knocked out by eventual winners Germany in the quarter-final stage of the tournament.

2016–2020 exclusion
After last featuring for France in a 4–0 win against Armenia on 8 October 2015, French Football Federation announced on 13 April 2016 that Benzema would not be picked for Euro 2016 tournament on home soil. He responded on 1 June 2016 in Marca, in an interview entitled 'Benzema: "Deschamps folded due to pressure from France's racist element"'.

Benzema was also left off the roster for the 2018 World Cup in Russia. Directing his frustration at FFF president Noël Le Graët, Benzema later tweeted: "Mr Le Graët, with all due respect, you've lost an opportunity to remain silent. I've discovered your true face, and this isn't the one that said he appreciated me and wouldn't discuss the subject of team selections!"

In November 2019, Benzema replied to Le Graët's comments that his career with France was over, by saying: "If you think I'm done, let me play with one of the other countries I am eligible for and we'll see".

Return to the squad, Nations League victory and retirement
On 18 May 2021, following speculation from the media, Benzema was officially included in France's 26-man squad for UEFA Euro 2020, his first call-up to the national team in over five years. He made his first appearance since his return on 2 June, in a 3–0 home win over Wales, in a friendly warm-up match before the final tournament, during which he missed a penalty, but was later also involved in the final goal scored by Antoine Griezmann. On 23 June 2021, he scored a brace in a 2–2 draw against Portugal, to be his first goals in the European Championship. He subsequently scored another brace in France's round-of-16 match against Switzerland, where France were knocked out of the tournament on penalties after a 3–3 draw. With four goals in as many games, Benzema won the Euro 2020 bronze boot.

In the 2021 UEFA Nations League semi-final on 7 October, Benzema scored France's first goal in the second half as they came from behind to defeat Belgium 3–2. He overtook Zidane in the France scoring records as he scored his 32nd goal for Le Blues to become the 6th top scorer in their history. In the Final three days later, he scored the temporary equaliser as France went on to clinch the title for the first time with a 2–1 victory over Spain; he was named "Player of the Match" by UEFA for his performance in the final. With two goals, he was the joint–top scorer of the Nations League Finals, along with Spain's Ferran Torres and teammate Kylian Mbappé, who won the top scorer trophy due to having also provided two assists – Benzema won the bronze boot due to playing more minutes than Torres. The Nations League was Benzema's first trophy with France's senior team and his 27th of his career, making him the most decorated Frenchman in football history.

On 13 November 2021, Benzema scored his first goals in the 2022 World Cup qualifiers with a brace in an 8–0 win over Kazakhstan as France booked their place for Qatar 2022. His brace saw him over-take David Trezeguet to become Les Bleus' fifth all-time top scorer with 35 goals. Although he was included in France's final squad for the 2022 FIFA World Cup, on 19 November, the French Football Federation stated that Benzema would be forced to miss the tournament due to a thigh injury. Despite not taking part in the tournament, Benzema was still awarded the silver medal as he was not replaced by another player unlike Christopher Nkunku, who was replaced by Randal Kolo Muani. On 19 December, Benzema announced his retirement from the national team.

Style of play
Generally known for both his finishing and playmaking, Benzema is regarded as one of the best forwards of his generation. He is a creative, skillful, quick, agile, and prolific forward, who is good in the air and capable of playing off the shoulders of the last defender, and has been described as an "immensely talented striker" who is "strong and powerful" and "a potent finisher from inside the box" with either foot, as well as his head, despite being naturally right footed. He is considered to be one of the best strikers of his generation, with his Real Madrid manager Ancelotti describing him "the best striker in the world" in 2021.

An atypical number 9, although he is usually deployed as a centre forward, and can operate as an out-and-out striker, Benzema is also capable of playing in several other offensive positions, and has been used on the wing, or even as a playmaker behind the main striker, either in the number 10 role as an attacking midfielder, or as a deep-lying forward. In addition to his goalscoring, Benzema is known for his willingness and ability to drop into deeper or wider positions, and either link-up play with midfielders, or use his strength and technical ability to hold up the ball with his back to goal to provide assists for teammates, courtesy of his vision, creativity, passing, and eye for the final ball; his playing style led one commentator to describe him as a "nine and a half". Highlighting his prolific goalscoring and his creative abilities, Benzema ranks as Madrid's all-time second-highest goalscorer and top assist provider, with 328 goals and 104 assists respectively.

During his time at Madrid, Benzema has also been praised by pundits for his work-rate and tactical intelligence off the ball, as well as his positional sense and attacking movement as a forward, which often draws opposing defenders out of position, and in turn creates spaces for his teammates; as such, he formed a strong offensive partnership with Cristiano Ronaldo during the latter's time with the club. Indeed, Benzema's movement drew defenders away and created space for Ronaldo to make attacking runs into the centre of the area from the left wing, which essentially saw the Frenchman act as a false 9. Following Ronaldo's departure in 2018, he took on a new role as the club's main striker, playing with his back to goal less frequently, and instead receiving the ball facing the goal and taking more touches inside the penalty area; in this position, he also often drifted out wide onto the left flank, while he was able to utilise his control and touch on the ball effectively to create goalscoring opportunities for himself inside the box. The positional change saw an increase in his goalscoring output for the club and an improvement in his shooting, for which he had occasionally come under criticism from the press in the past, as demonstrated by the variety of his goals, his conversion rate, and his clinical finishing with his feet as well as his head; however, in addition to taking over the role of the team's main goalscorer, he also still continued to serve as link-up player for the team's front line by creating chances for his teammates.

Personal life

Benzema was born in Lyon to French nationals of Algerian descent. His grandfather, Da Lakehal Benzema, lived in the village of Tigzirt, located in the northern town of Aït Djellil in Algeria before migrating to Lyon, where he eventually settled in the 1950s. Benzema's father, Hafid, was born in Tigzirt, while his mother, Wahida Djebbara, was born and raised in Lyon; her family originated from Oran. Benzema is the third youngest in the family and grew up with eight other siblings in Bron, an eastern suburb of Lyon. His younger brothers Gressy and Sabri are also footballers. The former plays at the amateur level with Vaulx-le-Velin in the Division d'Honneur, the sixth division of French football, while the latter plays in the youth academy of a club in the family's hometown of Bron.

On 3 February 2014, his  then-girlfriend  Chloé de Launay gave birth to their daughter Mélia in Madrid. On 5 May 2017, his girlfriend Cora Gauthier gave birth to their son Ibrahim. A practicing Muslim, Benzema observes fasting during the Islamic holy month of Ramadan. He has spoken about his faith saying: "My faith helps me to be focused every day. It brings me benefits and it's my strength for me, my family, as well as for my work – for literally everything."

Since evolving internationally, Benzema has participated in numerous advertising campaigns. He was chosen as an ambassador of the American video game publisher Electronic Arts for the FIFA series. He has signed several sponsorship contracts, notably with the Korean automobile manufacturer Hyundai, the French telephone operator SFR and its subsidiary BuzzMobile, the French bank LCL and the sports betting company bwin. Benzema is sponsored by Adidas. In 2017, his documentary film Le K Benzema was released. In 2020, Benzema started his own YouTube channel, uploading videos of his everyday life, as well as interviews and fan Q&As.

Controversies and legal issues
On 6 December 2006, he told RMC about his possible selection for the Algerian team: "It's my parents' country, it's in my heart. But well, from a sporting perspective, it's true I'll play in the French team. I'll always be available for the French team [...] It's more for the sporting side, because Algeria is my country, you see, my parents come from there. France, on the other hand ... it's more of a sport thing, that's it." Benzema drew some criticism for these comments, as well as for his reluctance to sing the French national anthem, "La Marseillaise", before each match with the national team.

On 18 April 2010, French television channel M6 reported that four members of the French national team were being investigated for their roles as clients in a prostitute ring operated inside of a Paris nightclub, with some of the women possibly being underage. The players were eventually revealed to be Franck Ribéry, Sidney Govou, Hatem Ben Arfa and Benzema. Benzema was alleged to have had a sexual rendezvous with a prostitute when she was 16 years of age, an act Benzema denied through his lawyer. On 20 July, Benzema was questioned by Paris police and indicted on the charge of "solicitation of a minor prostitute". In November 2011, prosecutors asked for the cases against Ribéry and Benzema to be dropped, saying that the players were not aware that the escort, identified as Zahia Dehar, was 16 years old. However, the case did go on to trial. In January 2014, the judge in the case dropped the charges against both Ribery and Benzema saying there was lack of sufficient evidence that the pair knew the prostitutes were underaged.

On 4 November 2015, Benzema was arrested by French police for his alleged part in blackmailing fellow France international player Mathieu Valbuena over the alleged recording of a sex-tape on a mobile phone. During the investigation over the blackmail plot, French Prime Minister Manuel Valls stated, "A great athlete should be exemplary. If he is not, he has no place in the France team. There are so many kids, so many youngsters in our suburbs that relate to great athletes. They wear the blue jersey, the colours of France, which are so important in these moments." On 10 December 2015, the president of the FFF Noël Le Graët announced the provisional suspension of the striker from the French team until a new development in the affair. On 17 February 2016, the judicial review was lifted by the investigating judge who allowed Benzema to get in touch again with Valbuena. On 11 July 2017, the Court of Cassation issued a judgment in which it invalidated a decision of the Court of Appeal of Versailles, which had validated the procedure by which Benzema had been indicted for complicity of attempted blackmail. This decision was made on the basis of contesting the legality of the phone calls recording by the police, and the judgement did not disprove the veracity of the blackmail attempt on Valbuena by Benzema. On 7 January 2021, the public prosecutor's office in Versailles announced that Benzema would face trial for his alleged involvement in the blackmail attempt. On 24 November 2021, Benzema was found guilty of conspiring to blackmail Valbuena with a sex tape. The judge gave him a one-year suspended sentence and fined him €75,000. His lawyers said they will appeal his conviction. He will be definitively sentenced in this case in June 2022, after having abandoned the appeal procedure.

In March 2020, during an Instagram livestream with YouTuber and internet personality Mohamed Henni, Benzema made controversial remarks about French player Olivier Giroud, who replaced Benzema in the France national team. He called Giroud "karting" while he referred to himself as "Formula 1". On 10 March 2023, France head coach Didier Deschamps stated in an interview with Le Parisien that he had told Benzema following his injury prior to the 2022 FIFA World Cup that there was "no emergency" and that he could "organize his return" from injury with the team manager. Deschamps then claimed that Benzema made the decision to leave the France team himself, saying "when I woke up, I learned that he had left". However, Benzema responded on his Instagram story by reposting the Deschamps statement in the interview with the caption "but what audacity". He posted a further story of French Snapchat personality Ritchie repeating the phrase "liar, you are a liar".

Career statistics

Club

International

Scores and results list France's goal tally first, score column indicates score after each Benzema goal.

Honours

Club
Lyon
Ligue 1: 2004–05, 2005–06, 2006–07, 2007–08
Coupe de France: 2007–08
Trophée des Champions: 2006, 2007

Real Madrid
La Liga: 2011–12, 2016–17, 2019–20, 2021–22
Copa del Rey: 2010–11, 2013–14
Supercopa de España: 2012, 2017, 2021–22
UEFA Champions League: 2013–14, 2015–16, 2016–17, 2017–18, 2021–22
UEFA Super Cup: 2014, 2016, 2017, 2022
FIFA Club World Cup: 2014, 2016, 2017, 2018, 2022

International
France U17
UEFA European Under-17 Championship: 2004

France
UEFA Nations League: 2020–21
FIFA World Cup runner-up: 2022

Individual
 Ballon d'Or: 2022
 UEFA Men's Player of the Year: 2021–22
 Golden Player Man Award: 2022
 Onze d'Or: 2020–21, 2021–22
 French Player of the Year: 2011, 2012, 2014, 2021
 UEFA Champions League Player of the Season: 2021–22
 UEFA Champions League top goalscorer: 2021–22
 FIFA FIFPRO World 11: 2022
 La Liga Player of the Season: 2019–20, 2021–22
 La Liga Best Player (voted by Marca fans): 2019–20, 2020–21, 2021–22
 Trofeo Alfredo Di Stéfano: 2019–20, 2021–22
 Pichichi Trophy: 2021–22
 UEFA Champions League top assist provider: 2011–12
 UEFA Champions League Squad of the Season: 2020–21
 UEFA Champions League Team of the Season: 2021–22
 IFFHS Men's World Team: 2022
 Globe Soccer Awards Men's Player of the Year: 2022
 Bravo Award: 2008
 Ligue 1 top scorer: 2007–08
 Coupe de France top scorer: 2007–08
 UNFP Ligue 1 Player of the Month: January 2008, April 2008
 UNFP Ligue 1 Player of the Year: 2007–08
 UNFP Ligue 1 Team of the Year: 2007–08
 Golden Lion for the best Lyon sportsman: 2007, 2008
 French Rookie of the Year: 2006
 Étoile d'Or: 2007–08
 La Liga Team of the Season: 2018–19, 2019–20, 2020–21, 2021–22
 UEFA La Liga Team of the Season: 2019–20
 La Liga Player of the Month: October 2014, June 2020, March 2021, September 2021, April 2022
 Supercopa de España top scorer: 2021–22, 2022–23
 Real Madrid Player of the Season (voted by supporters): 2015–16, 2018–19, 2019–20, 2021–22
 Best French Player playing Abroad: 2019, 2021, 2022
 AS Player of the Year: 2021
 Kicker Player of the Season: 2022
 Madrid Sports Press Association Award (APDM)
 ESM Team of the Year: 2020–21, 2021–22
 L'Équipe's Team of the Year: 2020, 2021, 2022
 2005 UEFA–CAF Meridian Cup top scorer
 UEFA European Championship Bronze Boot: 2020
 UEFA Nations League Finals Bronze Boot: 2021
 UEFA Nations League Finals Goal of the Tournament: 2021
 Member of Guinness World Records 2021: Player with the most consecutive seasons in the UEFA Champions League (qualified for and played in the competition without interruption since 2005)

See also
List of footballers with 100 or more UEFA Champions League appearances

Notes

References

External links
 
 
 
 
  
 Real Madrid official profile
 
 
 
 
 
 

1987 births
Living people
Footballers from Lyon
French footballers
France youth international footballers
France under-21 international footballers
France international footballers
Association football forwards
Olympique Lyonnais players
Real Madrid CF players
Ligue 1 players
La Liga players
UEFA Champions League winning players
UEFA Champions League top scorers
UEFA Euro 2008 players
UEFA Euro 2012 players
2014 FIFA World Cup players
UEFA Euro 2020 players
UEFA Nations League-winning players
Pichichi Trophy winners
French expatriate footballers
Expatriate footballers in Spain
French expatriate sportspeople in Spain
French Muslims
French sportspeople of Algerian descent
French people of Kabyle descent
Ballon d'Or winners
2022 FIFA World Cup players